Jai Kumar Singh is an Indian politician and was Minister of State for Jail and Public Service Management in the Government of Uttar Pradesh. He was elected to 17th Vidhan Sabha as Apna Dal (Sonelal) candidate from Jahanabad constituency of Fatehpur district. Then he was elected to 18th Vidhan Sabha as Apna Dal (Sonelal) candidate from Bindki constituency of Fatehpur district.

Political career

Jaiki is member of Apna Dal (Sonelal). He has been a member of the 17th Legislative Assembly of Uttar Pradesh from Jahanabad.
Now he is member of 18th Legislative Assembly of Uttar Pradesh from Bindki.

Posts held

See also

 Yogi Adityanath ministry (2017–)

References

Yogi ministry
Uttar Pradesh MLAs 2017–2022
People from Fatehpur district
Living people
Apna Dal (Sonelal) politicians
Year of birth missing (living people)